Amtala High School is a secondary and higher secondary educational school located at Amtala, Naoda, Murshidabad District, West Bengal, India.

Overview
The school is situated in a semi-urban area. There are 43 teachers in this school. The school is a co-educational school.

References

High schools and secondary schools in West Bengal
Schools in Murshidabad district
Educational institutions established in 1919
1919 establishments in India